Andilly may refer to:

Places in France

 Andilly, Charente-Maritime in the Charente-Maritime department
 Andilly, Meurthe-et-Moselle in the Meurthe-et-Moselle] department
 Andilly, Haute-Savoie in the Haute-Savoie department
 Andilly, Val-d'Oise in the Val-d'Oise department
 Andilly-en-Bassigny in the Haute-Marne department

People

Robert Arnauld d'Andilly (1589-1674), a French state counsellor
Simon Arnauld de Pomponne (1618-1699), a French diplomat